Pinalia, commonly known as gremlin orchids, is a genus of flowering plants in the family Orchidaceae. Orchids in this genus are large epiphytic or lithophytic plants with prominent pseudobulbs, each with up to three thin, flat leaves and cup-shaped, relatively short-lived flowers with scale-like brown hairs on the outside. There are about 120 species occurring from tropical to subtropical Asia to the south-west Pacific.

Description
Orchids in the genus Pinalia are epiphytic or lithophytic, rarely terrestrial herbs with prominent, fleshy pseudobulbs that are covered with papery brown bracts when young. Each pseudobulb has up to three thin, leathery, linear to lance-shaped leaves. The flowers are resupinate, usually cup-shaped and last for a few days. The dorsal sepal is narrower than the lateral sepals which are attached at their base to the column to form a small ledge. The labellum is hinged to the base of the column and has three relatively small lobes.

Distribution
Orchids in the genus Pinalia occur in China (about 17 species), Japan, the Ryukyu Islands, Taiwan, the Indian subcontinent, the Andaman Islands, Laos, Myanmar, the Nicobar Islands, Thailand, Vietnam, Borneo, Java, the Lesser Sunda Islands, Peninsular Malaysia, the Maluku Islands, the Philippines, Sulawesi, Sumatra, New Guinea, the Solomon Islands, Queensland (Australia) and Samoa.

Taxonomy and naming
The genus Pinali was first formally described in 1826 by John Lindley who published the description in Orchidearum Sceletos.
The name Pinalia is based on an unpublished name suggested by Francis Buchanan-Hamilton, derived from a Nepalese word meaning a type of forest yam.

Species list
Species accepted by the Plants of the World Online as of February 2021:

Pinalia acervata 
Pinalia acutifolia 
Pinalia acutissima 
Pinalia affinis 
Pinalia amica 
Pinalia amplectens 
Pinalia ancorifera 
Pinalia angustifolia 
Pinalia annapurnensis 
Pinalia anomala 
Pinalia apertiflora 
Pinalia appendiculata 
Pinalia atrovinosa 
Pinalia baeuerleniana 
Pinalia baniae 
Pinalia barbifrons 
Pinalia bengkulensis 
Pinalia bhutanica 
Pinalia bicolor 
Pinalia biglandulosa 
Pinalia bilobulata 
Pinalia bipunctata 
Pinalia bogoriensis 
Pinalia bractescens 
Pinalia braddonii 
Pinalia brownei 
Pinalia carnicolor 
Pinalia carnosula 
Pinalia celebica 
Pinalia cepifolia 
Pinalia chrysocardium 
Pinalia clavata 
Pinalia cochinchinensis 
Pinalia compacta 
Pinalia compressiflora 
Pinalia concolor 
Pinalia conferta 
Pinalia connata 
Pinalia consanguinea 
Pinalia curranii 
Pinalia cycloglossa 
Pinalia cylindrostachya 
Pinalia dagamensis 
Pinalia dasypus 
Pinalia daymaniana 
Pinalia deliana 
Pinalia densa 
Pinalia distans 
Pinalia diversicolor 
Pinalia djaratensis 
Pinalia donnaiensis 
Pinalia dura 
Pinalia earine 
Pinalia elata 
Pinalia erecta 
Pinalia eriopsidobulbon 
Pinalia erosula 
Pinalia eurostachys 
Pinalia euryloba 
Pinalia excavata 
Pinalia fitzalanii 
Pinalia flavescens 
Pinalia floribunda 
Pinalia formosana 
Pinalia glabra 
Pinalia globulifera 
Pinalia gracilicaulis 
Pinalia graciliscapa 
Pinalia graminifolia 
Pinalia grandicaulis 
Pinalia hosei 
Pinalia hutchinsoniana 
Pinalia ignea 
Pinalia japonica 
Pinalia jarensis 
Pinalia jimcootesii 
Pinalia lamonganensis 
Pinalia lancilabris 
Pinalia latiuscula 
Pinalia ledermannii 
Pinalia leucantha 
Pinalia lineata 
Pinalia lineoligera 
Pinalia longicruris 
Pinalia longilabris 
Pinalia longlingensis 
Pinalia lyonii 
Pinalia maboroensis 
Pinalia macera 
Pinalia mafuluensis 
Pinalia maingayi 
Pinalia maquilingensis 
Pinalia meghasaniensis 
Pinalia mentaweiensis 
Pinalia merapiensis 
Pinalia merguensis 
Pinalia merrittii 
Pinalia microchila 
Pinalia microglossa 
Pinalia minahassae 
Pinalia moluccana 
Pinalia multiflora 
Pinalia murkelensis 
Pinalia myristiciformis 
Pinalia mysorensis 
Pinalia nielsenii 
Pinalia obesa 
Pinalia obscura 
Pinalia obvia 
Pinalia occidentalis 
Pinalia ochracea 
Pinalia oligotricha 
Pinalia opeatoloba 
Pinalia oreogena 
Pinalia ovata 
Pinalia pachyphylla 
Pinalia pachystachya 
Pinalia palmifolia 
Pinalia pandurata 
Pinalia petiolata 
Pinalia philippinensis 
Pinalia phreatiopsis 
Pinalia piruensis 
Pinalia pokharensis 
Pinalia polystachya 
Pinalia polyura 
Pinalia porphyroglossa 
Pinalia praecox 
Pinalia profusa 
Pinalia pumila 
Pinalia quinquangularis 
Pinalia quinquelamellosa 
Pinalia ramosa 
Pinalia ramulosa 
Pinalia recurvata 
Pinalia reticosa 
Pinalia rhodoptera 
Pinalia rhynchostyloides 
Pinalia rimannii 
Pinalia ringens 
Pinalia rolfei 
Pinalia saccifera 
Pinalia scotiifolia 
Pinalia semirepens 
Pinalia serrulata 
Pinalia shanensis 
Pinalia sharmae 
Pinalia shiuyingiana 
Pinalia simondii 
Pinalia simplex 
Pinalia sopoetanica 
Pinalia sordida 
Pinalia spicata 
Pinalia sublobulata 
Pinalia sumbawensis 
Pinalia sundaica 
Pinalia sutepensis 
Pinalia szetschuanica 
Pinalia taylorii 
Pinalia tenuiflora 
Pinalia toxopei 
Pinalia tricolor 
Pinalia triloba 
Pinalia trilophota 
Pinalia truncicola 
Pinalia vagans 
Pinalia vaginifera 
Pinalia versicolor 
Pinalia wildgrubeana 
Pinalia wildiana 
Pinalia woodiana 
Pinalia xanthocheila 
Pinalia yunnanensis

References

External links

 
Podochileae genera
Epiphytic orchids